Kromskiye Byki is a rural locality in Vyshnederevensky Selsoviet Rural Settlement, Lgovsky District, Kursk Oblast, Russia. Population:

Geography 
The village is located in the Byk River basin (a left tributary of the Seym), 30.5 km from the Russia–Ukraine border, 69 km south-west of Kursk, 19 km south-east of the district center – the town Lgov, 8 km from the selsoviet center – Vyshniye Derevenki.

 Climate
Kromskiye Byki has a warm-summer humid continental climate (Dfb in the Köppen climate classification).

Transport 
Kromskiye Byki is located on the road of regional importance  (Lgov – Sudzha), on the road of intermunicipal significance  (38K-030 – Kauchuk – 38K-024), 2.5 km from the nearest (closed) railway halt 25 km (railway line Lgov I — Podkosylev).

The rural locality is situated 75.5 km from Kursk Vostochny Airport, 130 km from Belgorod International Airport and 275 km from Voronezh Peter the Great Airport.

References

Notes

Sources

Rural localities in Lgovsky District